UFC 88: Breakthrough was a mixed martial arts event held by the Ultimate Fighting Championship (UFC) on September 6, 2008, at Philips Arena in Atlanta, Georgia. The event was headlined by a light heavyweight bout between Chuck Liddell and Rashad Evans.

Results

Bonus awards
Each of the following awards resulted in an additional $60,000 payout to the participating fighter:
Fight of the Night:  Kurt Pellegrino vs. Thiago Tavares
Knockout of the Night: Rashad Evans
Submission of the Night: Jason MacDonald

External links
UFC 88 Event Site
UFC 88 Fight Card

See also
 Ultimate Fighting Championship
 List of UFC champions
 List of UFC events
 2008 in UFC

References

Ultimate Fighting Championship events
2008 in mixed martial arts
Mixed martial arts in Georgia (U.S. state)
Sports competitions in Atlanta
2008 in Georgia (U.S. state)
Events in Atlanta